Night Chills is a suspense-horror novel by American writer Dean Koontz, originally published in 1976.

Plot summary
Widower Paul Annendale has taken his two children, Rya and Mark, on their annual camping vacation to the small New England town of Black Water.  What no one there knows is that the town has become a testing ground for a new experiment involving techniques related to subliminal advertising.  Developed by amoral scientist Ogden Salsbury and funded by multi-millionaire Leonard Dawson, this newly discovered technique was introduced into the town, with the aid of a chemical in the water supply and allows anyone with a special code phrase to gain total mind control of an exposed subject.  Together with local store owner Sam Edison, Paul intends to put a stop to this illegal conspiracy.

External links
Night Chills Book Review

American horror novels
1976 American novels
Novels by Dean Koontz
Novels set in Maine
Books with cover art by Paul Bacon
Atheneum Books books